Pleasant Valley is an unincorporated community in Hancock County, West Virginia, United States. Pleasant Valley is northeast of Weirton.

References

Unincorporated communities in Hancock County, West Virginia
Unincorporated communities in West Virginia